Alfredo Pián (October 21, 1912 – July 25, 1990) was an Argentinian racing driver. He entered the 1950 Monaco Grand Prix with a Maserati 4CLT run by Scuderia Achille Varzi. During the Saturday practice sessions, Pián, who had the sixth fastest time at that point, spun on an oil patch and crashed against the guard-rail, being thrown out of the cockpit. He sustained leg injuries and was not able to start the race, and the injury ended his career.

Complete Formula One World Championship results
(key)

References

1912 births
1990 deaths
People from Belgrano Department, Santa Fe
Argentine racing drivers
Argentine Formula One drivers
Sportspeople from Santa Fe Province